B32 or B-32 may refer to:
 B Boats B-32, an American sailboat design
 Bundesstraße 32, a German road
 B-32 Dominator, an American heavy bomber of World War II
 Bryan "Birdman" Williams, formerly known as B-32
 32 amp, type B – a standard circuit breaker current rating